James Burney (13 June 1750 – 17 November 1821) was an English rear-admiral, who accompanied Captain Cook on his last two voyages. He later wrote two books on naval voyages and a third on the game of whist.

Family
Burney was born in London, although he moved to Lynn Regis (now King's Lynn) as a small child. He was the son of the composer and music scholar Charles Burney and his wife Esther Sleepe (c. 1725–1762). He was the sister of correspondent Susanna, brother of Charles Burney and of the novelist and diarist Fanny Burney, and half-brother of the novelist Sarah Burney, who kept house for him from 1798 to 1803.

Voyages
Burney's father obtained him a berth as a midshipman on Cook's Resolution, which sailed for the South Seas in June 1772. Back in England in 1774, he acted as interpreter for Omai, the first Tahitian to visit Britain. He and his future brother-in-law witnessed Cook's killing in Hawaii in 1779. He was belatedly promoted, but in June 1782 commissioned captain of the 50-gun Bristol on a 12-ship convoy to Madras. He saw action as part of Sir Edward Hughes' squadron in the final engagement with the French fleet off Cuddalore on 20 June 1783.

Retired
At the end of 1784 Burney fell seriously ill and departed for England. This was the end of his active naval career. Repeated petitions for a new command were rebuffed, in part because of his openly republican political views. However, he became a prolific naval author, who enjoyed the friendship of Charles Lamb, Henry Crabb Robinson and other literary figures.

Burney married Sarah Payne (1759–1832) on 6 September 1785, by whom he had three children: Catherine (1786–1793), Martin Charles (1788–1852), later a solicitor, and Sarah (1796 – post-1868). However, he was separated from his wife and living with his half-sister from 1798 to 1803. He was elected a member of the Royal Society in 1809.

In July 1821, aged 71, Burney was promoted to rear-admiral on the retired list after a personal intervention by the Duke of Clarence (later William IV), Admiral of the Fleet. He died on 17 November 1821 and was buried at St. Margaret's, Westminster.

A great whist player, he left a pamphlet on the subject. When he died, Lamb wrote to William Wordsworth: "There's Captain Burney gone! – What fun has whist now?"

Bibliography
Chronological History of the Voyages and Discoveries in the South Sea or Pacific Ocean (London, 1803–1817), including History of the Buccaneers of America (1816) (5 volumes) v1 v2 v3 v4 v5

Chronological History of North-Eastern Voyages of Discovery and of the Early Eastern Navigations of the Russians (London: Payne & Foss, 1819)
An Essay by Way of Lecture on the Game of Whist (London: privately printed, 1821)

Sources

External links
Burney Centre at McGill University

English essayists
19th-century English historians
Royal Navy rear admirals
1750 births
1821 deaths
People from King's Lynn
James
Fellows of the Royal Society
English male non-fiction writers
British male essayists
James Cook